Oldfield is an unincorporated community in Christian County, Missouri, United States. The elevation is 1,381 feet. The community is part of the Springfield, Missouri Metropolitan Statistical Area.

Oldfield got rail service when a subsidiary of the St. Louis–San Francisco Railway (Frisco) extended a line from Ozark, Missouri to Chadwick, Missouri in the Spring of 1883.  But Passenger service on the Frisco line was discontinued in March of 1933, and in 1934 the line from Ozark to Chadwick was abandoned entirely.

Oldfield is home to the Oldfield Opry, a weekly country music show operated on a donations only basis. The show is held every Saturday night, and people come from miles around to listen to the classic country and western style music.

References

Unincorporated communities in Christian County, Missouri
Springfield metropolitan area, Missouri
Unincorporated communities in Missouri